Frédéric Lancien (born 14 February 1971) is a French former cyclist. He competed in the track time trial at the 1992 Summer Olympics.

References

External links
 

1971 births
Living people
French male cyclists
Olympic cyclists of France
Cyclists at the 1992 Summer Olympics
People from Concarneau
Sportspeople from Finistère
Cyclists from Brittany